The 2010 Air Force Falcons football team represented the United States Air Force Academy in the 2010 NCAA Division I FBS football season. The team was coached by fourth-year head coach Troy Calhoun and played their home games at Falcon Stadium in Colorado Springs, Colorado. They were members of the Mountain West Conference.

During their games against Navy and Army, the Falcons wore a special uniform design modeled after the flying suits and helmets worn by the United States Air Force Thunderbirds, with each player's nameplate featuring either the word "SERVICE" or "FREEDOM". Air Force defeated both Navy and Army, winning them the Commander-in-Chief's Trophy for the first time since 2002.

They finished the season 9–4, 5–3 in Mountain West play. They were invited to the Independence Bowl, where they defeated Georgia Tech, 14–7.

Schedule

Roster
QB Tim Jefferson, Jr.

Rankings

References

Air Force
Air Force Falcons football seasons
Independence Bowl champion seasons
Air Force Falcons football